Wilson Rodrigues Fonseca (born 21 March 1985), or simply Wilson, is a Brazilian striker, currently playing for Mirassol.

Biography
Born in Araras, São Paulo state, Wilson started his career at Corinthians. He spent two half season at Paulista FC in July 2005, from 2005 Campeonato Brasileiro Série B to 2006 Campeonato Paulista. In January 2008 he was signed by Italian Serie A team Genoa in -year contract for €1.1 million. Before that deal Corinthians only owned 50% economic rights and the other half was owned by Moacir da Cunha Viana. Corinthians later announced that the club only received R$ 0.689 million from Brod Island S.A. in its 2008 accounts. He was loaned back to Sport Recife at the start of 2008–09 Serie A. In July 2009 Sport signed him outright for free.

Wilson left for Chinese Super League club Shaanxi Chanba in February 2011. He left for Vegalta Sendai shortly after due to his lack of goals for the club.

Club career statistics
Updated to 23 February 2017.

1Includes Emperor's Cup.
2Includes J. League Cup.
3Includes Copa Libertadores and AFC Champions League.

Honours
 Brazilian First Division in 2005 with Corinthians
 Pernambuco state championship in 2010 with Sport Recife
 J. League Best Eleven: 2012

References

External links

Profile at Ventforet Kofu
Profile at Vegalta Sendai
Guardian Stats Centre
Pelé.Net 

Brazilian footballers
Brazilian expatriate footballers
Sport Club Corinthians Paulista players
Paulista Futebol Clube players
Genoa C.F.C. players
Beijing Renhe F.C. players
Clube Atlético Linense players
Fortaleza Esporte Clube players
Mirassol Futebol Clube players
Esporte Clube São Bento players
Chinese Super League players
Campeonato Brasileiro Série A players
Campeonato Brasileiro Série B players
Serie A players
Brazilian expatriate sportspeople in Italy
Brazilian expatriate sportspeople in China
Expatriate footballers in Italy
Expatriate footballers in China
Expatriate footballers in Japan
Sport Club do Recife players
J1 League players
Vegalta Sendai players
Ventforet Kofu players
Association football forwards
People from Araras
1985 births
Living people
Footballers from São Paulo (state)